The First Syrian Republic, officially the Syrian Republic, was formed in 1930 as a component of the Mandate for Syria and the Lebanon, succeeding the State of Syria. A treaty of independence was made in 1936 to grant independence to Syria and end official French rule, but the French parliament refused to accept the treaty. From 1940 to 1941, the Syrian Republic was under the control of Vichy France, and after the Allied invasion in 1941 gradually went on the path towards independence. The proclamation of independence took place in 1944, but only in October 1945 was the Syrian Republic de jure recognized by the United Nations; it became a de facto sovereign state on 17 April 1946, with the withdrawal of French troops. It was succeeded by the Second Syrian Republic upon the adoption of a new constitution on 5 September 1950.

Mandatory Syrian Republic (1930–1946)

The first Syrian constitution

The project of a new constitution was discussed by a Constituent Assembly elected in April 1928, but as the pro-independence National Bloc had won a majority and insisted on the insertion of several articles "that did not preserve the prerogatives of the mandatary power", the Assembly was dissolved on August 9, 1928. On May 14, 1930, the State of Syria was declared the Republic of Syria and a new Syrian Constitution was promulgated by the French High Commissioner, in the same time as the Lebanese Constitution, the Règlement du Sandjak d'Alexandrette, the Statute of the Alawi Government, the Statute of the Jabal Druze State. A new flag was also mentioned in this constitution:
The Syrian flag shall be composed as follows, the length shall be double the height. It shall contain three bands of equal dimensions, the upper band being green, the middle band white, and the lower band black. The white portion shall bear three red stars in line, having five points each.

During December 1931 and January 1932, the first elections under the new constitution were held, under an electoral law providing for "the representation of religious minorities" as imposed by article 37 of the constitution. The National Bloc was in the minority in the new chamber of deputies with only 16 deputies out of 70, due to intensive vote-rigging by the French authorities. Among the deputies were also three members of the Syrian Kurdish nationalist Xoybûn (Khoyboun) party, Khalil bey Ibn Ibrahim Pacha (Al-Jazira Province), Mustafa bey Ibn Shahin (Jarabulus) and Hassan Aouni (Kurd Dagh). There were later in the year, from March 30 to April 6, "complementary elections".

In 1933, France attempted to impose a treaty of independence heavily prejudiced in favor of France. It promised gradual independence but kept the Syrian mountains under French control. The Syrian head of state at the time was a French puppet, Muhammad 'Ali Bay al-'Abid. Fierce opposition to this treaty was spearheaded by senior nationalist and parliamentarian Hashim al-Atassi, who called for a 60-day strike in protest. Atassi's political coalition, the National Bloc, mobilized massive popular support for his call. Riots and demonstrations raged, and the economy came to a standstill.

Franco-Syrian Treaty of Independence and the Sandjak of Alexandretta

After negotiations in March with Damien de Martel, the French High Commissioner in Syria, Hashim al-Atassi went to Paris heading a senior National Bloc delegation. The new Popular Front-led French government, formed in June 1936 after the April–May elections, had agreed to recognize the National Bloc as the sole legitimate representatives of the Syrian people and invited al-Atassi to independence negotiations. The resulting treaty called for immediate recognition of Syrian independence as a sovereign republic, with full emancipation granted gradually over a 25-year period.

In 1936, the Franco-Syrian Treaty of Independence was signed, a treaty that would not be ratified by the French legislature. However, the treaty allowed Jabal Druze, the Alawite region (now called Latakia), and Alexandretta to be incorporated into the Syrian Republic within the following two years. Greater Lebanon (now the Lebanese Republic) was the only state that did not join the Syrian Republic. Hashim al-Atassi, who was Prime Minister during King Faisal's brief reign (1918–1920), was the first president to be elected under a new constitution adopted after the independence treaty.

The treaty guaranteed incorporation of previously autonomous Druze and Alawite regions into Greater Syria, but not Lebanon, with which France signed a similar treaty in November. The treaty also promised curtailment of French intervention in Syrian domestic affairs as well as a reduction of French troops, personnel and military bases in Syria. In return, Syria pledged to support France in times of war, including the use of its air space, and to allow France to maintain two military bases on Syrian territory. Other political, economic and cultural provisions were included.

Atassi returned to Syria in triumph on September 27, 1936 and was elected President of the Republic in November.

In September 1938, France again separated the Syrian Sanjak of Alexandretta and transformed it into the State of Hatay. The State of Hatay joined Turkey in the following year, in June 1939. Syria did not recognize the incorporation of Hatay into Turkey and the issue is still disputed until the present time.

The emerging threat of Adolf Hitler induced a fear of being outflanked by Nazi Germany if France relinquished its colonies in the Middle East. That, coupled with lingering imperialist inclinations in some levels of the French government, led France to reconsider its promises and refuse to ratify the treaty. Also, France ceded the Sanjak of Alexandretta, whose territory was guaranteed as part of Syria in the treaty, to Turkey. Riots again broke out, Atassi resigned, and Syrian independence was deferred until after World War II.

World War II and independence
With the fall of France in 1940 during World War II, Syria came under the control of the Vichy Government until the British and Free French invaded and occupied the country in July 1941. Syria proclaimed its independence again in 1941 but it was not until 1 January 1944 that it was recognized as an independent republic.

In the 1940s, Britain secretly advocated the creation of a Greater Syrian state that would secure Britain preferential status in military, economic and cultural matters, in return for putting a complete halt to Jewish ambition in Palestine. France and the United States opposed British hegemony in the region, which eventually led to the creation of Israel.

On 27 September 1941, France proclaimed, by virtue of, and within the framework of the Mandate, the independence and sovereignty of the Syrian State. The proclamation said "the independence and sovereignty of Syria and Lebanon will not affect the juridical situation as it results from the Mandate act. Indeed, this situation could be changed only with the agreement of the Council of the League of Nations, with the consent of the Government of the United States, a signatory of the Franco-American Convention of April 4, 1924, and only after the conclusion between the French Government and the Syrian and Lebanese Governments of treaties duly ratified in accordance with the laws of the French Republic.

Benqt Broms said that it was important to note that there were several founding members of the United Nations whose statehood was doubtful at the time of the San Francisco Conference and that the Government of France still considered Syria and Lebanon to be mandates.

Duncan Hall said "Thus, the Syrian mandate may be said to have been terminated without any formal action on the part of the League or its successor. The mandate was terminated by the declaration of the mandatory power, and of the new states themselves, of their independence, followed by a process of piecemeal unconditional recognition by other powers, culminating in formal admission to the United Nations. Article 78 of the Charter ended the status of tutelage for any member state: 'The trusteeship system shall not apply to territories which have become Members of the United Nations, relationship among which shall be based on respect for the principle of sovereign equality.'" So when the UN officially came into existence on 24 October 1945, after ratification of the United Nations Charter by the five permanent members, as both Syria and Lebanon were founding member states, the French mandate for both was legally terminated on that date and full independence attained.

On 29 May 1945, France bombed Damascus and tried to arrest its democratically elected leaders. While French planes were bombing Damascus, Prime Minister Faris al-Khoury was at the founding conference of the United Nations in San Francisco, presenting Syria's claim for independence from the French Mandate.

Syrian independence was de jure attained on 24 October 1945. Continuing pressure from Syrian nationalist groups and British pressure forced the French to evacuate their last troops on 17 April 1946.

Independent First Syrian Republic (1946–1950)

Constitutional amendments
The constitution of 1930 was amended in 1947.

In 1947, Syria joined the International Monetary Fund (IMF) and pegged its currency to the U.S. dollar at 2.19148 pounds = 1 dollar, a rate which was maintained until 1961. The Lebanese and Syrian currencies split in 1948.

1948 Arab–Israeli War and aftermath
The Arab League failed in the 1948 Arab–Israeli War.

Husni al-Za'im took power in 1949 but died later that year. He was succeeded by Atassi.

A new constitution was drafted and adopted in 1950, marking the beginning of the Second Syrian Republic.

Notes

References

Modern history of Syria
Former countries in the Middle East
Former republics
French Mandate for Syria and the Lebanon
States and territories established in 1930
States and territories disestablished in 1946
1950 disestablishments in Asia
1930 establishments in the French colonial empire
1946 disestablishments in the French colonial empire